Princeton High School
is a public high school located in Princeton, North Carolina, United States. It serves grades 6–12 and is part of the Johnston County School District. Princeton High School has 1,465 students.  Princeton Elementary School, grades K–5, located a few miles away, became a separate school at the start of the 2008–2009 school year.

History

The first graduating class came in 1923 and consisted of four girls and one boy.  Miss Myrtle Nicholson served as the principal for two school years, 1921–1922 and 1922–1923.  Following Miss Nicholson's departure came M.P. Young.  Young became the second official principal in 1924, and had previously served as a teacher at the school.  In 1925, when the school was officially accredited by the state of North Carolina, there were forty-five students.  The current building stands in front of where the original once stood.  The old building was demolished in 1998.

Principals
 J. U. Teague
 Mr. Bridges
 Myrtle Nicholson (1921–1922)
 Blanche Penny (1923)
 Marvin Pleasant Young (1924–1943)
 Stephen Clarence Woodard (1944–1947)
 Lyman J. Worthington (1948–1966)
 John Turnage (1967–1969)
 Blani Moye (1970)
 Fred Leroy Bartholomew (1971–1998)
 Kirk Denning (1999–2016)
 Jarvis Ellis (2016–present)

Athletics
The Princeton Bulldogs are a part of the North Carolina High School Athletic Association.  The Bulldogs compete in the 2-A classification.  The Bulldogs have won several state championships in various sports. This is a list of the sports offered at Princeton High School:

Baseball
The Bulldogs have won three state baseball championships (1992, 1994, 2007), and earned one state runner-up (1993).

Football
The Bulldogs have been to the 1-A football state runner-up few times, but have never won a state championship. The Bulldogs have not competed in a football state championship game since 1979.

References

External links
 Princeton High School website

Public high schools in North Carolina
Public middle schools in North Carolina
Schools in Johnston County, North Carolina
1923 establishments in North Carolina
Educational institutions established in 1923